al-Buqa' is an 'Uzlah in Kitaf wa Al Boqe'e District, Saada Governorate, Yemen.

History
The area was allegedly used as Saudi training grounds for child soldiers in the 21st century.

Geography
al-Buqa' is one of the northernmost areas in Yemen; a nearby border crossing into Saudi Arabia was a war zone between the two countries in the Second Saudi-Yemeni War.

References

Saada Governorate